The Newcastle Jets 2010–11 season was the Newcastle Jets' sixth season since the inception of the Australian A-League and the tenth since the club's founding, in 2000.

It was announced on 22 July 2010 that Michael Bridges would be the Newcastle Jets senior team captain, With Ljubo Miličević to be his deputy.

Prior to Newcastle's round 4 games against Brisbane Roar, it was revealed that the club was under significant financial stress. This meant that the club was unable to pay staff and player wages on time. This resulted in the club seeking either a loan or an advance on their quarterly share of the television deal. It was announced by the club and the Football Federation Australia that the governing body would give a short term assistance package, making sure the club made it through their next few games and back into financial viability.

After giving Con Constantine every chance to show that he was able to prove financial viability, it was determined by the FFA that the best course of action would be to sell the club to mining magnate and horse owner Nathan Tinkler. In the first few weeks under his ownership Tinkler stated that he wished to give the club back to the community, and he made several key changes to the way the club was run. These changes included appointing an executive chairman in Ken Edwards to run the club while a board of directors and football advisory board were put in place. Tinkler also extended his ownership of the Jets to last until at least 2020. This enabled the club to move forward with a new direction which included resigning manager Branko Culina on a four-year contract, and doubling the footballing departments budget from $1.1million to around $2.5million, creating 8 new full-time positions at the club and 15 jobs in total.

As part of a new initiative called "Be a part of it", the Jets will host a community day, where 10,000 fans will be admitted free for the game against Melbourne Heart on 31 October 2010. A new price structure for tickets includes a free season pass for children younger than 15, a family pass for 11 home games with reserved grandstand for $100 and general admission for $10. The club has a new sponsor with Hunter Medical Research Institute. The Jets will have the institute's logo on the front of their jersey and will donate $5000 for every goal they score at home and $2500 for an away goal. The changes continued when the club set up a new administration office, extended the contract of coach Branko Culina until March 2015 and unveiled a $2.5 million blueprint for the football department.

The Newcastle Jets announced with the FFA and the State Government, that they would host the Los Angeles Galaxy at Energy Australia Stadium on 27 November. The match, an almost certain sellout, will play host to big-name players; David Beckham, and Landon Donovan.

2010–11 season squads

Senior squad

Beginning of season transfers 

In:
 Kasey Wehrman – Fredrikstad FK
 Ruben Zadkovich – Derby County
 Jeremy Brockie – North Queensland Fury FC
 Taylor Regan – Youth League
 Marcello Fiorentini – A.C. Palazzolo 1913
 Zhang Shuo – Persik Kediri
 Paul Henderson – Sydney Olympic

Out:
 Matt Thompson – Melbourne Heart FC
 Jason Naidovski – Contract Expired
 Shaun Ontong – Contract Expired
 Angelo Costanzo – Retired
 Jason Hoffman – Melbourne Heart FC
 Song Jin-Hyung – Tours FC
 Fabio Vignaroli – Released Due To Injury
 Donny de Groot – Go Ahead Eagles

Re-signed:
 Ljubo Miličević – 1 Year
 Ben Kennedy – 2 Years
 Michael Bridges – 2 Years
 Marko Jesic – 1 Year
 Neil Young – 1 Year
 Labinot Haliti – 2 Years
 Tarek Elrich – 2 Years
 Adam D'Apuzzo – 1 Year
 Ali Abbas Al-Hilfi – 1 Year

Unsuccessful trialists:
 Sibusiso Zuma
 Chaimir Toloy
 Griffin McMaster
 Chris Price
 David D'Apuzzo
 Aaron Clapham

Youth squad

Women's squad

Pre-season fixtures

The Newcastle Jets will play two trial games for players currently playing in the NBN State Football League. These games will give players from the Under-20, and First Grade teams from within the competition to have the opportunity to earn an A-league contract, and give the Newcastle Jets the chance to observe the best of the local youth talent.

Mid-season fixtures

After the ownership change, the new structure wanted to show an exhibition match. After a few days of hard work and collaboration between the Newcastle Jets, the FFA and the New South Wales Government, it was announced at a press conference at Newcastle University that the Newcastle Jets would host David Beckham's LA Galaxy.

2010–11 Hyundai A-League fixtures

Season statistics

Goal scorers
Last updated 18 August 2010

Discipline

Home attendance

References

External links
 

2010–11
2010–11 A-League season by team